VHA may refer to for:
Veterans Health Administration, a sub-department of the United States Department of Veterans Affairs
Vodafone Hutchison Australia, a company formed in 2009 by the merger of Vodafone Australia and Hutchison 3G Australia
VHA, Inc., an American healthcare supply chain company, one of the predecessors of Vizient, Inc.
VHA, airline code of VH-Air Industrie, an Angolan airline
Vancouver Hebrew Academy, a Canadian orthodox Jewish school